Close Enough for Love may refer to:

 "Close Enough for Love" (song), a 1979 jazz standard written by Johnny Mandel and Paul Williams
 Close Enough for Love (Peggy Lee album), 1979 
 Close Enough for Love (Andy Williams album), 1986
 Close Enough for Love (Shirley Horn album), 1989
 Close Enough for Love (Fleurine album), 1999
 Close Enough for Love, a 1991 album by Mike Metheny